Robert Garrison may refer to:

Robert F. Garrison (1936– 2017), American astrophysicist

Rob Garrison (1960– 2019), American actor
Robert Garrison (actor)  (1872–1930), German actor

Robert Garrison (sculptor) (1895–1943), American sculptor